Flockina von Platen (14 May 1903 – 26 November 1984) was a German actress.

She was born in Stolp, Pomerania, Germany (now Słupsk, Pomeranian Voivodeship, Poland) and died at age 81 in West Berlin, West Germany.

Selected filmography
 The Dagger of Malaya (1919)
 The Paw (1931)
 Spoiling the Game (1932)
 The Countess of Monte Cristo (1932)
 Quick (1932)
 Wrong Number, Miss (1932)
 The Valley of Love (1935)
 The Court Concert (1936)
 The Great and the Little Love (1938)
 Heimatland (1939)
 Nanette (1940)
 Kora Terry (1940)
 Uncle Kruger (1941)
 What Does Brigitte Want? (1941)

References

External links
 

1903 births
1984 deaths
German film actresses
People from Słupsk
People from the Province of Pomerania
20th-century German actresses